Cendana Auto Rover is a Malaysian military light utility vehicle or light tactical vehicle designed and manufactured by a local company Cendana Auto. This vehicles has similarities to the Humvee made by the United States. It is designed to have the ability to be modular for use in various operations hence its consist of various configuration depending on the mission.

History

The development of the vehicle first unveiled by the company in 2018. Its first started with the Special Operation Vehicle (SOV) variant where Cendana Auto introduces its SOV prototype to the public in conjunction of Defence Services Asia (DSA) 2018. According to the company, this SOV prototype was built in response to the Malaysian Army requirement for the light assault vehicle procurement. The SOV variant has a length of 4.95 meters, 1.85 meters high and 1.85 meters wide. Its powered by a single stage turbo diesel engine of 197 horsepower and the speed of the vehicle can reach to a maximum of 170 km/h.

In 2019, Malaysian Army open a tender to seeks the new light tactical vehicle in various configuration. The variants includes Fitted For Radio Vehicles (FFR), Special Operations Vehicles (SOV), Machine Gun Carriers, Grenade Launcher Carriers and Anti-Tank Guided Missile Vehicles (ATGM). In response to this tender, Cendana Auto announces that they will build the new improved and enlarged version prototype of the vehicle for the testing by the Malaysian Army and ready to be delivering 207 units vehicles to the Malaysian Army in various configuration starting 2021.

Variants

Fitted For Radio
Command and communication variant equipped with communication suite. 70 units ordered by Malaysian Army.

Special Operation Vehicle
Known as SF-21X. First unveiled in Defence Service Asia 2018. Offered to the Malaysian Army under the light assault vehicle procurement program. 16 units ordered by Malaysian Army.

Weapon Carrier
Known as Armed Tactical Ground Vehicles ARTAC. Equipped with light weapon such as machine gun and grenade launcher. 49 units ordered by Malaysian Army.

Mortar Transporters
The MT-815 is equipped with Expal 81mm mortar with the Talos fire control system. Able to carried 90 rounds of ammunition. It can embark a total of six personnel. 72 units ordered by Malaysian Army.

Operators
 : 207 units of all variants.

See also
 Weststar GK-M1

Similar vehicles
 Pindad Maung, Indonesian military light vehicle
 Indonesian Light Strike Vehicle, Indonesian military light vehicle
 Humvee, US military light vehicle
 Dongfeng EQ2050, Chinese military vehicle

References

Military light utility vehicles
Armoured fighting vehicles of Malaysia
Military vehicles of Malaysia
Off-road vehicles